Dominic von Habsburg (born 4 July 1937) is a member of the Grand Ducal Family of Tuscany and the House of Habsburg-Lorraine. He is also the Carlist-Carloctavismo pretender to the throne of Spain under the name Domingo I.

Into the family he is named Niki. In 1942, after spending the first few years of his childhood at Sonnberg Castle, he moved with his parents, his brother, and his four sisters to Romania. In Romania, Dominic resided with his parents at Bran Castle, Braşov. After his first cousin, King Michael I of Romania, was forced to abdicate the throne in 1947, Dominic and his family were exiled by the Communist regime and sought refuge in Switzerland and Argentina before ultimately settling in the United States.

Personal life 
In 1956, the Comunión Carloctavista y Círculo Carlos VIII courted Dominic as the legitimate Carlist claimant and heir to the Spanish throne to counter Generalísimo Francisco Franco's choice of Juan Carlos as king of Spain. In 1975 the Comunión Carloctavista y Círculo Carlos VIII affirmed his legitimacy as Domingo I.

Dominic returned to Austria in 1961 and resided there until 1976, when he moved to the Dominican Republic, Antigua, and Italy, and finally settled in New York. Dominic was naturalized as a United States citizen in 2004.

In 2012 Senator Iñaki Anasagasti of the Basque County proposed the idea of creating a Catalan-Basque-Navarrese monarchy with Archduke Dominic as its king.

Dominic gained International renown in 2006 following the restitution of Bran Castle (commonly known as Dracula's Castle) in Transylvania, Romania, which had been appropriated by the Communists in 1948.

He married firstly Virginia Engel von Voss (31 March 1937 – 27 September 2000) on 11 June 1960, and had two sons. They divorced in 1999 and married Israeli born Emmanuella Mlynarski (born 14 January 1948, former El Al flight attendant and former wife of Gad Yaacobi) on 14 August 1999.
Count Sandor von Habsburg (born 13 February 1965); married Priska Vilcsek (born 18 March 1959) on 15 May 2000 and were divorced on 22 December 2009. They had one son. He remarried Herta Öfferl on 24 December 2010.
Count Constantin von Habsburg (born 11 July 2000)
Count Gregor von Habsburg (born 20 November 1968); married Jacquelyn Frisco (born 17 November 1965) on 13 August 2011.

Professional life 
Dominic is an alumnus of the Brooks School and the Rhode Island School of Design, graduating from RISD in 1960 with a BFA in Industrial Design. In 1962, he established his own design and marketing consultancy firm in Austria, which covered a variety of companies and products throughout Europe and the United States. In 1969, he founded and directed the department for Product Research, Development and Design, at Semperit AG (later Continental Tire).

Between 1974 and 1978, the United Nations Industrial Development Organization and the World Bank enlisted him as an expert in Central America and Africa for small and medium-size industries. He was also an arts instructor in the Piesting grade school in Austria (1974–75) and a professor of industrial engineering and management at CEAT-INTEC in the Dominican Republic.

In 1976, he established a silk-screen printing studio for tropical fashions in Antigua, West Indies. At the request of the Antiguan W.I. Ministry of Education, he conducted courses for educators in hand-crafts and fine arts.

Today, Dominic is retired and living in New York. He continues to pursue art and design as well as running Bran Castle.

Titles
As a member of the Tuscan line of the House of Habsburg-Lorraine Dominic is an Archduke of Austria, Prince of Hungary and Bohemia, Prince of Tuscany with the style His Imperial and Royal Highness.

References 

1937 births
Living people
Dominic
Austrian princes
Carlist pretenders to the Spanish throne
People with acquired American citizenship
Brooks School alumni
Rhode Island School of Design alumni
Austrian emigrants to the United States
Knights of the Golden Fleece of Austria
Navarrese titular monarchs